Julie O'Connor is a Northern Irish journalist.

Broadcasting career
O'Connor joined UTV as a reporter in 2003.  She previously worked as a reporter for the Belfast Telegraph.

References 

Journalists from Northern Ireland
UTV (TV channel)
Year of birth missing (living people)
Living people
People educated at St Michael's Grammar School, Lurgan